20 Golden Greats is a 1976 greatest hits album by the Beach Boys that was released in the UK by EMI's newly created TV advertising division.  It became the second biggest selling album of the year, spending a total of 86 weeks on the UK Albums Chart and peaking at number one in July 1976, where it remained for 10 weeks.

Track listing
Tracklist corresponds to the original LP release. The 1987 CD reissue has some small differences, most notably the replacement of various Duophonic mixes with mono versions.

Charts

Weekly charts

Year-end charts

Certifications and sales

See also
List of albums which have spent the most weeks on the UK Albums Chart

References

1976 greatest hits albums
The Beach Boys compilation albums
Capitol Records compilation albums